The 1976 British Grand Prix (formally the John Player Grand Prix) was a Formula One motor race held on 18 July 1976 at the Brands Hatch circuit in Kent, England, United Kingdom. The 76-lap race was the ninth round of the 1976 Formula One season.

British driver James Hunt was involved in a first corner crash that brought out the red flags. Hunt drove his damaged car back to the pits, but did not complete a full lap of the track to do so, instead driving through an access road on the Cooper Straight. The officials declared that, since he had not been on the circuit when the red flag was waved, Hunt would not be allowed to take part in the restart. This news led to much angry feeling amongst the British crowd, who chanted Hunt's name until the stewards, fearing crowd trouble, announced that Hunt would be allowed to take the restart. Hunt duly won the restarted race. Immediately after the race, the Ferrari, Tyrrell and Fittipaldi teams protested against the inclusion of Hunt's car. In September, two months after the event, a decision was reached and Hunt was disqualified, giving Niki Lauda the race win.

Report

Background
This was the only Formula One Grand Prix in which multiple female racers (Lella Lombardi and Divina Galica) were entered. Neither qualified for the Grand Prix.

The Brands Hatch layout had been modified from the previous year. Paddock Hill, Bottom Straight (renamed Cooper Straight) and South Bank (renamed Surtees) had all been slightly modified. The pit lane was extended and many of the corners were renamed, all after racing drivers and teams.

Race
At the start, Hunt made a relatively poor start and allowed Lauda to pull away. By contrast, Clay Regazzoni starting from fourth made a good start from the second row, and attempted to take the lead from Lauda at the first corner. Regazzoni made contact with his Ferrari team-mate which resulted in a broken rear wheel on Lauda's car, and him spinning his own car. Regazzoni's car was then hit by cars behind, resulting in damage to several more cars including those of Hunt and Jacques Laffite. Due to the amount of debris covering the track as a result, the race was stopped.

The McLaren, Ferrari and Ligier teams set about preparing the spare cars for Hunt, Regazzoni and Laffite respectively in the belief that there was insufficient time for their original cars to be repaired. However, the race stewards announced that no driver would be allowed to take part in the restarted race unless they were in their original car, and that they had finished the first lap of the original race. This meant that the spare cars could not be used, and the drivers that had returned to the pits at the end of the first lap would not be allowed to restart.

Some debate then ensued, during which time the McLaren mechanics managed to repair Hunt's damaged McLaren which he had used in the original start. Despite having failed to complete the first lap, Hunt was now at least not in a replacement car, and with the crowds chanting "We Want Hunt" with bottles and other litter thrown to the track with the potential of crowd trouble with the British fans, the stewards relented and allowed Hunt to take the restart. In the event, both Regazzoni and Laffite also took the restart, although both in replacement cars, with the two teams opting to compete anyway and face possible exclusion after the race.

At the second attempt to start the race, Lauda again led the field, with Hunt second, Regazzoni third and Scheckter fourth. Laffite retired on lap 32 and Regazzoni on lap 37 due to suspension problems and low oil pressure respectively.

Lauda led the race for the first 45 laps, until gearshift problems allowed Hunt to overtake him. Hunt continued to build up a lead from Lauda for the rest of the race, and crossed the finish line in first position.

Post-race
Immediately following the race, the Ferrari, Tyrrell and Copersucar teams protested the result to the stewards. The three teams believed that as Hunt had not completed a lap following the accident, then under the regulations, he should not have been allowed to take the restart. Following a three-hour meeting, the officials dismissed the protests and announced the original result would stand.

Ferrari announced that they would submit an appeal to the RAC, the governing body of motorsport in Britain who were responsible for sanctioning and organizing the British Grand Prix. A meeting was held in London on 4 August, where the Ferrari team again put forward their view that Hunt did not complete a lap, and therefore should not have been permitted to take part in the restart. In explaining their reason for dismissing the appeal, the RAC stated that although Hunt did not finish the lap, his car was still moving at the time the race was stopped, and this was sufficient to allow him to restart.

Ferrari then protested the result to the FIA, which resulted in a tribunal being convened to hear Ferrari's appeal. The tribunal was held in Paris on 25 September, where Ferrari put forward their belief that Hunt's car had been pushed by his mechanics before the race had been halted, breaking the regulation prohibiting outside assistance during the race. McLaren maintained that they had only pushed the car after the race had been stopped.

The decision reached by the tribunal was to uphold the appeal by Ferrari, and disqualify Hunt from the race. This in turn resulted in all the other drivers moving up one position, and hence making Lauda the winner of the race.

Classification

Qualifying classification

Race classification

Championship standings after the race

Drivers' Championship standings

Constructors' Championship standings

Note: Only the top five positions are included for both sets of standings. Standings are as at the conclusion of the race, i.e. before Hunt's disqualification (which did not occur until 25 September). Numbers without parentheses are Championship points; numbers in parentheses are total points scored (only the best 7 results from the first 8 races of the season and the best 7 results from the last 8 races counted towards the Championship).

References

British Grand Prix
British Grand Prix
Grand Prix
British Grand Prix
Formula One controversies